Fegan is a last name that may refer to:

 Dan Fegan (1962–2018), prominent NBA agent
 J. W. C. Fegan (1852–1925), English evangelist and orphanage founder
 John Fegan (politician) (1862–1932), Australian politician
 John Fegan (actor) (1908–1981), Australian film and television actor
 John Fegan (rugby union) (1872–1949), English rugby union player*
 Owen Fegan (born 1972), Irish artist
 Roy Fegan (born 1961), American actor
 Roshon Fegan (born 1991), American actor
 Terrence Fegans aka Tee Fegans (born 1996),
American Recording Artist/LLC Owner

See also
 Fegan Floop, a fictional character in the Spy Kids film series
 Fegen (disambiguation)